Monségur is the name or part of the name of the following communes in France:

 Monségur, Gironde, in the Gironde department
 Monségur, Landes, in the Landes department
 Monségur, Lot-et-Garonne, in the Lot-et-Garonne department
 Monségur, Pyrénées-Atlantiques, in the Pyrénées-Atlantiques department
 Cours-de-Monségur, in the Gironde department
 Saint-Vivien-de-Monségur, in the Gironde department